Thomas John Campbell (born August 14, 1952) is an American academic, educator, and politician. He is a Professor of Law at the Dale E. Fowler School of Law, and a professor of economics at the George Argyros School of Business and Economics, at Chapman University, in Orange, California.

He was Dean of Chapman University School of Law from 2011–16, Director of Finance for the State of California from 2004 to 2005, a former five-term Republican United States Congressman from California's 12th and 15th districts, a former member of the California State Senate, a former professor at Stanford Law School, former dean of the Haas School of Business, and former professor of business administration at the University of California, Berkeley.

In 2000 he retired from his House seat to run for the U.S. Senate but lost decisively to incumbent Dianne Feinstein. On June 8, 2010, he lost his third bid for the United States Senate, campaigning once again for the seat held by Democrat Barbara Boxer but losing the Republican nomination to Carly Fiorina.

Campbell is a member of the ReFormers Caucus of Issue One.

To date, he is the last Republican to serve as representative from California’s 12th congressional district.

Early life
Born in Chicago, Campbell was the valedictorian of Chicago's St. Ignatius College Prep, Class of 1969. He went on to obtain his B.A. and M.A. degrees from the University of Chicago (1973), a J.D. from Harvard Law School (1976) and then a subsequent Ph.D. in economics from the University of Chicago (1980). He served as a clerk to U.S. Supreme Court Justice Byron White from 1977 to 1978 and, the year before that, for U.S. Court of Appeals Judge George E. MacKinnon. His mentor was Milton Friedman. Tom Campbell's father was the late Hon. William Joseph Campbell, a former  Chief Judge of the United States District Court for the Northern District of Illinois. While Tom Campbell was raised in a Democratic family, he joined the Republican Party in 1980.

Campbell was admitted to the Illinois bar in 1976 and went into private practice in Chicago. He was a White House Fellow in the offices of the Chief of Staff and Counsel (1980–1981). He then served in the Reagan Administration as Director of the Bureau of Competition in the Federal Trade Commission from 1981-1983, the youngest person ever to serve in that position.

Law professor
Campbell became a law professor at Stanford Law School in 1983, receiving tenure as a full professor in 1987.

Congressional and State Senate career

Campbell ran for the Republican nomination in California's 12th Congressional District, which included his home in Campbell and the campus of Stanford University.  The 12th had traditionally been a moderate Republican bastion, but had grown increasingly friendly to Democrats over the years. Campbell soundly defeated first-term incumbent Ernie Konnyu in the Republican primary and narrowly defeated his Democratic opponent, San Mateo County Supervisor Anna Eshoo. He served two terms before making an unsuccessful bid for the Republican nomination for the Senate seat being vacated by Alan Cranston. He lost the Republican primary to a considerably more conservative Republican, Bruce Herschensohn, who in turn was defeated by Democratic Congresswoman Barbara Boxer. His political career might have been in jeopardy in any case; his district had been renumbered as the 14th District and had been made considerably more Democratic than its predecessor. Eshoo won the seat and still holds it today; no Republican running in this district (now numbered as the 18th District) has won more than 39 percent of the vote since Campbell left office.

In 1993, California State Senator Becky Morgan stepped down mid-term, and Campbell won a special election to succeed her; the state Senate district overlapped significantly with his old congressional district. In the California state Senate, Campbell was Chairman of the Housing Committee, Vice Chairman of the Education Committee, and served on the Budget Committee. California Journal rated him the Best Problem Solver in the State Senate, the Most Ethical State Senator, and the overall Best State Senator.

In 1995, 15th District Democratic Congressman Norman Mineta, later the Secretary of Commerce under President Bill Clinton and Secretary of Transportation under George W. Bush, unexpectedly resigned. Campbell's home had been re-drawn into this San Jose-based district, and he ran in the special election. Mineta had held the seat since 1975, and it was widely considered a safe Democratic district.  Despite the considerable disadvantage in voter registration and Democratic attempts to tie him to Speaker Newt Gingrich, Campbell won the December special election easily. He won a full term almost as easily in 1996 and was handily re-elected in 1998.

During both of his stints in Congress, Campbell was regarded as one of the most moderate House Republicans. Though conservative on fiscal matters, he is socially liberal, being pro-choice on abortion and in favor of gay rights. This was not surprising, as Bay Area Republicans tend to be more moderate on social and environmental matters than their counterparts in the rest of California. He has a decided libertarian streak, and remains popular with libertarian-leaning Republicans. As a fiscal conservative, he was the only Republican in the House to vote against the Taxpayer Relief Act of 1997.

Campbell led a group of 17 bipartisan members of Congress who filed a lawsuit against President Clinton in 1999 over his conduct of the war in Kosovo. In the filing, they accused Clinton of not reporting to Congress within 48 hours on the status of the action as required by the 1973 War Powers Resolution and not first obtaining a declaration of war from Congress as required in the Constitution. Congress had voted 427 to 2 against a declaration of war with Yugoslavia and had voted to deny support for the air campaign. A federal judge dismissed the lawsuit, ruling that since Congress had voted for funding after the U.S. was actively engaged in the war with Kosovo, legislators had sent a confusing message about whether they approved of the war. Campbell said afterwards that this was a sidestepping of the law, and lawmakers who disagree with a war should not be forced to cut off funding for troops who are in the midst of it in order to get a judge to order an end to it.

In 2000, Campbell won the Republican nomination to take on Democratic Senator Dianne Feinstein. Although he touted his service as a moderate Republican representing a strongly Democratic district, he was considered a decided underdog. Campbell was badly defeated, losing by over 19 points. He even lost his own district by almost 15 points. Democratic State Assemblyman Mike Honda, a Mineta protege, won Campbell's House seat by 12 points over Republican State Assemblyman Jim Cunneen, a former aide to Campbell. As of 2020, Campbell is the last elected Republican to have represented a significant portion of San Jose above the county level.

In 2008, Campbell wrote in Reason that he would be voting no on Proposition 8, the proposed ballot measure banning same-sex marriage in the state, per his Republican beliefs that "government should be limited. Government has no business making distinctions between people based on their personal lives." Proposition 8 eventually passed by a margin of 52-48%.

Campbell is a supporter of the National Popular Vote Interstate Compact.

Return to legal scholarship

In 2000, Campbell returned to Stanford.  He remained there until his appointment at the Haas School of Business at UC Berkeley in 2002. In the intervening years, he began to assemble the material, out of his professional political experiences, for his book The Separation of Powers in Practice  with Stanford University Press.

As Dean of the Haas School, Campbell stressed the study of corporate social responsibility and business ethics amid an era of corporate scandals. A full-fledged Center for Responsible Business was established. In September 2004, Campbell was named by California Governor Arnold Schwarzenegger to his newly formed Council of Economic Advisors.  From 2004 to 2005, Campbell took a leave of absence from his Berkeley post to serve as director of the California Department of Finance in the Schwarzenegger administration.

On August 27, 2007, Campbell announced that he would step down from his position at Haas in the summer of 2008.
In mid-2008, Campbell joined the Palo Alto office of Los Angeles-based Gibson, Dunn & Crutcher LLP. Campbell joined the Chapman School of Law for a 2-year visiting appointment which began January 2009, serving as the Fletcher Jones Distinguished Visiting Professor at Chapman University School of Law.  In February 2011, Chapman announced that Campbell would be its new Dean.  Campbell replaced interim Dean Scott Howe, who replaced Dean John C. Eastman, who stepped down to seek the 2010 Republican nomination for Attorney General of California (Campbell had filed paperwork to seek the 2010 Republican nomination for Governor of California the day after stepping down as Dean of Haas before going on to seek the 2010 Republican nomination for U.S. Senator from California; neither Eastman and Campbell won the Republican nomination in their respective races).

Return to politics
In July 2008, Tom Campbell filed the necessary paperwork in order to establish a committee with the intent to raise funds for a prospective race for the Republican nomination to be Governor of California in 2010.

On January 13, 2010, the Wall Street Journal reported that Campbell would run for the United States Senate, instead of for Governor of California.
Campbell's Web Site confirmed it. In the primary on June 8, Campbell finished a distant second to former Hewlett-Packard CEO Carly Fiorina, in a race that also included State Assemblyman Chuck DeVore.  The primary election received national attention, in part due to a campaign ad released by Carly Fiorina, depicting Campbell as a "Demon Sheep."

2016 U.S. presidential election
In August 2016, Campbell published an op-ed in The Mercury News calling on the Republican National Committee to replace Donald Trump as the nominee for President, and saying Campbell would withdraw from the Republican Party if that did not happen. Campbell wrote:

On Aug. 9, Trump said, "If she gets to pick her judges, nothing you can do, folks. ... Although the Second Amendment people -- maybe there is, I don't know." Trump's campaign explained this meant Second Amendment supporters would defeat Clinton at the ballot box. That, however, is not a logical interpretation of the remark. The context was what can be done if Clinton becomes president; not what can be done to stop her from becoming president. As such, this is a statement of great recklessness, made all the more so by our present environment of violence used to advance extremism.

<p>Trump's words were similar to other calls he has made to ignore the rule of law. He has proposed ordering members of the U.S. military to violate American law regarding torture, assuring us that his orders, rather than the law, would be obeyed. He has encouraged physical violence by individuals against protesters at his rallies, assuring anyone doing so that he would cover their legal costs. He has threatened to use the antitrust laws against a company and an individual because the newspaper that individual owns has criticized him.

Campbell also said he could not support the Democratic nominee, Hillary Clinton, either, due to her involvement in the email controversy. Campbell officially changed his registration to independent shortly thereafter.

In 2016, Campbell wrote a column for the Orange County Register, which, while not endorsing Gary Johnson for president, suggested libertarian-leaning Republicans should consider him. Campbell was later one of 30 former Republican members of Congress who wrote an open letter denouncing Trump's candidacy. Campbell was also included on a list of potential Supreme Court nominees issued by Libertarian Party nominee Gary Johnson. Campbell was speculated to be a possible candidate for the Libertarian nomination in 2020, but instead he endorsed former Judge Jim Gray for the nomination. Campbell proceeded to co-found the centrist Common Sense Party due to what he perceived as a want for such a party among California residents.

Personal life
Campbell married Susanne Martin in 1978.

Awards
2016 Anti-Defamation League Orange County/Long Beach Marcus Kaufman Jurisprudence Award

1998 University of Chicago Alumni Professional Achievement Award

Books
Separation of Powers in Practice (2004)

See also 
 List of law clerks of the Supreme Court of the United States (Seat 6)

References

External links

CAMPBELL, Thomas J., (1952– ), Biographical Directory of the United States Congress
Our Campaigns
Profile at Chapman University

Join California Tom Campbell 

|-

|-

|-

|-

|-

|-

1952 births
Living people
20th-century American male writers
20th-century American non-fiction writers
20th-century American politicians
21st-century American male writers
21st-century American non-fiction writers
21st-century American politicians
Academics from California
American male non-fiction writers
American political writers
California Independents
California state senators
Chapman University School of Law faculty
Harvard Law School alumni
Law clerks of the Supreme Court of the United States
People associated with Gibson Dunn
People from Campbell, California
Reagan administration personnel
Recipients of the Order of the Cross of Terra Mariana, 1st Class
Republican Party members of the United States House of Representatives from California
San Francisco Bay Area politicians
St. Ignatius College Prep alumni
Stanford Law School faculty
State cabinet secretaries of California
Schools of the Sacred Heart alumni
Haas School of Business faculty
University of Chicago alumni
White House Fellows
Writers from California